In the United States, reserved spaces are mandated by the Americans with Disabilities Act Accessibility Guidelines.

Disabled placards 

The following table, current as of 2020, shows the state agency responsible for issuing disabled parking placards, expiration of permanent/temporary placards, fees (if applicable), and supplementary notes.

Disabled plates 

The following table, current as of 2020, shows the state agency responsible for issuing disabled plates, length of validity of registration for plates and/or any renewal requirements (if applicable), fees (either regular automotive registration fees and/or any fees charged beyond regular automotive registration fees), fee amounts if assessed beyond regular automotive registration fees (if applicable), and supplementary notes.

Disabled parking space requirements 

According to the Americans With Disabilities Act Handbook, "Accessible parking spaces should be at least 96 in (2440 mm) wide. Parking access aisles shall be part of an accessible route to the building or facility entrance..."

Disabled parking permits generally take the form of either specially marked license plates or a placard that hangs from the rear-view mirror. Plates are generally used for disabled drivers on their personal vehicle, while the portable disability placard can be moved from one vehicle to another with the disabled person, both when driving or when riding with another driver.

The medical requirements to obtain a permit vary by state, but are usually confined to specific types of disabilities or conditions. These as a general rule include the use of any assistive device such as a wheelchair, crutches, or cane, as well as a missing leg or foot. Some states also include certain cardiovascular, pain, or respiratory conditions. About half of US states (26) include blindness as a qualifying disability enabling the person to obtain a disability parking permit for use as a passenger, and 14 states include a disabled hand as a qualifying disability. Four states include deafness (Georgia, Kentucky, Virginia, Wyoming), and two states (Virginia and New York) include mental illness or developmental disabilities as qualifying disabilities.

Disability parking placards come in various colors with the significance varying from state to state. The most common are red for temporary placards and blue for permanent ones.

The availability of specially reserved parking spaces is regulated by both federal and state laws. Generally at least one space is available at any public parking location, with more being required based on the size of the parking lot and in some cases the type of location, such as a health care facility. Parking spaces reserved for disabled people are typically marked with the International Symbol of Access, though in practice, the design of the symbol varies widely. Often, the parking space is delineated with blue lines instead of the white or yellow lines used elsewhere in the lot. Anyone parking in such reserved spaces must have their disability plate or mirror placard displayed, or else the car can be ticketed for illegal parking. In some major US cities, local law also allows such vehicles to park for free at city parking meters and also exempts from time limits on time parked. In the US states of California, Illinois, Maryland, Massachusetts, South Carolina, Texas, Utah, and Virginia, holders of a Disabled parking permit are exempt from parking meter fees (in Illinois, only disabled drivers who meet specific criteria are eligible for free parking). In some states (including Virginia) accessible-designated parking meters exist, which, unless the permit holder is exempt, must be paid at the same rate as non-designated meters. One will also be subject to receiving a violation ticket if a valid disability license plate or placard is not displayed on the vehicle. Fraudulent use of another person's placard is heavily fined.

If traveling from other countries, requirements to obtain a parking permit vary from state to state. Some states will honor other country permits, while others require application as a visitor/tourist.

Canada's provinces will honor a US state issued disabled plate or placard since US states will honor Canadian disabled plates and placards.

In all types of dwellings, United States federal law states that it is unlawful and discriminatory to refuse services that may assist in making reasonable accommodations for those with disabilities. This includes any services or facilities that are necessary in order for the occupant to inhabit their dwelling as deemed standard.

Integration with electric vehicle charging 

In California alone, there are over 27,000 Plug in Electric Vehicles (PEV) with about 2,000 being added every month. While most PEV charging is done at home, the public charging infrastructure is also expanding, with 6218 public charging stations as of July 2013. Although the number of PEVs is still a small portion of the cars on the road, and the number of PEVs with Handicap placards is much smaller still, the needs of handicap PEV drivers must be integrated with public charging spaces. Guidelines are that 1 in 25 PEV Charging Stations be made ADA space compliant. Although not intuitively obvious, it's important to recognize that a PEV charging station is not parking space, rather a charging service, in the same manner that gas station fill up spots are not parking spaces. Electric vehicle charging stations that meet the ADA space requirements are not to be reserved exclusively for the use of persons with disabilities, they are shared by any PEV needing to charge. Further more any PEV charging space, ADA space compliant or not, cannot be used by non-PEV vehicles, including those with handicap placards. Recommended signage, along with common courtesy, ask that ADA space compliant charging stations are to be used last.

Abuse 

The abuse and misuse of disabled parking permits has been identified as a major problem in the US, with some estimates indicating the majority seen on the street are used or obtained fraudulently. The substantial privilege and convenience granted by a permit provides a major incentive to use one illegally or obtain one fraudulently, and medical privacy law often confounds attempts to identify truly disabled individuals from abuses. In 1999, for example, 19 of UCLA's current and former football players were charged with abuse of disabled parking placards. In 2013 a news program in Los Angeles filmed people using disabled parking placards outside a health club, including one of the health club's celebrity instructors and young adults with the placard of a 77-year-old.

Abuse occurs under the following circumstances:

 A non-disabled driver using the vehicle, plate or placard of another person who is disabled without transporting that person. This often occurs with family members of disabled people.
 Using an illegally purchased placard that originally was issued to another person.
 Forging a physician's signature on the form submitted to the motor vehicle department.
 Feigning or exaggerating symptoms of a medical condition in order to convince a physician to submit the form.

A related issue is physician approval of permits for medical conditions that do not actually qualify under that jurisdiction's requirements. Often this is simply an error on the physician's part due to not fully understanding the law. A common example is cognitive, psychiatric, or developmental conditions (such as autism), which in all but two states do not qualify for a permit. Such permits are still legal and valid, and most recipients honestly believe they have a qualifying disability. The result is far more permits than existing parking spaces can usually support, which often leaves more severely disabled individuals without a place to park.

Disabled persons who hold parking permits but have invisible disabilities may be difficult to tell apart from fraudulent permit users. On occasion, suspicion of fraud has led to hostility against legitimate permit holders.

New York City 
Disabled drivers from outside New York City who possess state-issued disability parking permits have claimed illegal discrimination and civil rights violations on the part of New York City. In 1991 a disabled elderly man from New Jersey was issued a ticket while parking in Brooklyn while displaying his New Jersey-issued disability parking placard. In 1997 a woman with multiple sclerosis using a wheelchair was similarly issued a ticket while parking in New York City for displaying a non-NYC issued disability parking placard. Both drivers maintain that failure to recognize non-NYC disability parking placards is a violation of their civil rights.

The city does recognize valid placards from other jurisdictions for marked disabled parking spaces, all of which are in off-street lots.

See also 
 Disabled parking permit
 Adapted automobile
 Parking violation

References

External links

BlueBadgeParking.com—a worldwide, crowd-sourced map of disabled parking locations with SatNav downloads]

Identifiers
Disability rights
Parking law
Vehicle registration plates